This is a list of the largest daily changes in the S&P 500 from 1923. Compare to the list of largest daily changes in the Dow Jones Industrial Average.

Largest percentage changes 
While the S&P 500 was first introduced in 1923, it wasn't until 1957 when the stock market index was formally recognized, thus some of the following records may not be known by sources.

Largest closing point changes 
The two tables below show the largest one-day changes between a given day's close and the close of the previous trading day in terms of points.

Largest intraday point swings 
This table shows the largest intraday point swings since 1967.

Largest daily percentage changes each year 

* Year has not yet ended.

See also 
S&P 500
List of largest daily changes in the Dow Jones Industrial Average
List of largest daily changes in the Nasdaq Composite
List of largest daily changes in the Russell 2000

References 

List
Economy-related lists of superlatives